Hardek is a settlement that is an urban continuation of Ormož in northeastern Slovenia. The area traditionally belonged to the Styria region and is now included in the Drava Statistical Region.

The outbuildings of Ormož Castle are located in the south of the settlement. The U-shaped building with an inner courtyard dates to the 18th century.

References

External links
Hardek on Geopedia

Populated places in the Municipality of Ormož